This article contains records of the VTB United League since its establishment in 2008.

Individual records

Game 
 Most minutes in a game
 49:58 – David McClure, Neptunas (against Enisey) – December 13, 2012
 Most points in a game
 49 – Stevan Jelovac, Nizhny Novgorod (against Kalev) – February 15, 2018
 Most points in a half
 28 – Ty Abbott, Kalev (against Nizhny Novgorod) – October 20, 2013 
 Most points in a quarter
 26 – Kasey Shepherd, Nizhny Novgorod (against Khimki) – September 23, 2020
 Most points in an overtime period
 13 – Scott Machado, Kalev (against Krasnye Krylia) – February 11, 2015
 Most field goals made in a game
 16 – Maciej Lampe, UNICS (against Honka) – March 16, 2011
 16 – Cory Higgins, Triumph (against Azovmash) – November 28, 2013
 Most field goals attempted in a game
 31 – Alexey Shved, Khimki (against CSKA) – March 4, 2019
 Most field goals missed in a game
 21 – Alexey Shved, Khimki (against CSKA) – March 4, 2019
 Most field goals made in a game, no misses
 12 – James Augustine, Khimki (against CSKA) – January 26, 2014
 Most field goals attempted in a game, none made
?
 Most 3-point field goals made in a game
 12 – Egor Vyaltsev, Khimki (against Astana) – February 14, 2016
 Most 3-point field goals attempted in a game
 24 – Ronald Clark, Bisons (against Avtodor) – April 10, 2016
 Most 3-point field goals made in a half
 7 – Egor Vyaltsev, Khimki (against Astana) – February 14, 2016
 Most 3-point field goals made in a quarter
 6 – Roope Ahonen, Bisons (against Krasnye Krylia) – December 15, 2014
 6 – Egor Vyaltsev, Khimki (against Astana) – February 14, 2016
 Most 3-point field goals made in a game, no misses
 6 – Jānis Blūms, Lietuvos Rytas (against Azovmash) – March 24, 2013
 6 – Sonny Weems, CSKA (against Tsmoki-Minsk) – December 23, 2014
 Most 3-point field goals attempted in a game, none made
 11 – Jānis Timma, Khimki (against Zielona Góra) – September 25, 2019
 Most free throws made in a game
 19 – Michał Ignerski, Krasnye Krylia (against Enisey) – May 4, 2014
 Most free throws attempted in a game
 22 – Michał Ignerski, Krasnye Krylia (against Enisey) – May 4, 2014
 Most free throws made in a half
 15 – Michał Ignerski, Krasnye Krylia (against Enisey) – May 4, 2014
 Most free throws made in a quarter
 10 – Michał Ignerski, Krasnye Krylia (against Enisey) – May 4, 2014
 Most free throws attempted in a half
 18 – Michał Ignerski, Krasnye Krylia (against Enisey) – May 4, 2014
 Most free throws attempted in a quarter
 13 – Michał Ignerski, Krasnye Krylia (against Enisey) – May 4, 2014
 Most free throws made in a game without a miss
 13 – Malcolm Delaney, Lokomotiv-Kuban (against Nizhny Novgorod) – March 13, 2016
 Most free throws attempted in a game, none made
?
 Most rebounds in a game
 25 – Shawn King, Kalev (against Tsmoki-Minsk) – April 24, 2016
 Most rebounds in a half
 15 – Shawn King, Tsmoki-Minsk (against Honka) – January 28, 2011
 15 – Shawn King, Kalev (against Tsmoki-Minsk) – April 24, 2016
 Most rebounds in a quarter
 11 – Shawn King, Tsmoki-Minsk (against Honka) – January 28, 2011
 Most defensive rebounds in a game
 17 – Donatas Motiejūnas, Prokom (against Nymburk) – December 4, 2011
 17 – Josh Harrellson, VEF (against Avtodor) – April 16, 2016
 Most offensive rebounds in a game
 11 – Vitautas Sarakauskas, Neptunas (against Krasnye Krylia) – February 14, 2014
 Most assists in a game
 23 – D. J. Cooper, Enisey (against Astana) – January 24, 2015
 Most assists in a half
 13 – D. J. Cooper, Enisey (against VEF) – October 9, 2014
 13 – D. J. Cooper, Enisey (against Astana) – January 24, 2015
 Most assists in a quarter
 10 – D. J. Cooper, Enisey (against Astana) – January 24, 2015
 Most steals in a game
 8 – DeAndre Kane, Nizhny Novgorod (against Zenit) – November 13, 2016
 Most steals in a half
 6 – Tyler Honeycutt, Khimki (against Avtodor) – October 6, 2014 
 Most steals in a quarter
 5 – John Prince, Turów (against Spartak) – January 12, 2014 
 Most blocks in a game
 7 – Bamba Fall, Kalev (against Azovmash) – December 2, 2012
 7 – Olaseni Lawal, Astana (against Azovmash) – February 2, 2014
 Most blocks in a half
 5 – Kervin Bristol, Krasnye Krylia (against Tsmoki-Minsk) – October 14, 2014
 Most blocks in a quarter
 4 – Mirza Begić, Žalgiris (against VEF) – October 31, 2010 
 4 – Semen Antonov, Nizhny Novgorod (against Spartak) – May 2, 2013
 Most received blocks in a game
 5 – Bamba Fall, Kalev (against Lokomotiv-Kuban) – October 5, 2013
 5 – Malcolm Delaney, Lokomotiv-Kuban (against Nymburk) – October 7, 2015
 5 – Andre Jones Jr., VITA (against CSKA) – January 24, 2016
 Most turnovers in a game
 9 – Nemanja Protić, Nizhny Novgorod (against VEF) – November 12, 2011
 9 – Aaron Miles, Krasnye Krylia (against Khimki) – February 4, 2012
 9 – Nick Calathes, Lokomotiv-Kuban (against Žalgiris) – October 6, 2012 
 9 – Scottie Reynolds, VEF (against Krasnye Krylia) – November 3, 2014 
 9 – Scott Machado, Kalev (against Lokomotiv-Kuban) – January 18, 2015 
 9 – Victor Zaryazhko, Krasnye Krylia (against Kalev) – February 11, 2015
 Most received personal fouls in a game
 14 – Alexey Shved, Khimki (against CSKA) – June 10, 2018
 Quickest disqualification
 5:28 – Uladzimir Krysevich, Minsk-2006 (against CSKA) – January 21, 2012

Season 
 Most games played
 42 – Quino Colom (UNICS, 2015–16)
 Most minutes per game average
 36:34 – Courtney Fortson (Avtodor, 2014–15)
 Most minutes
 1278:34 – Keith Langford (UNICS, 2015–16)
 Highest points per game average
 23.27 – Nicolas Minnerath (Avtodor, 2016–17)
 Most points
 851 – Keith Langford (UNICS, 2015–16)
 Most field goals made
 306 – Keith Langford (UNICS, 2015–16)
 Most field goals attempted
 627 – Keith Langford (UNICS, 2015–16)
 Most field goals missed
 321 – Keith Langford (UNICS, 2015–16)
 Highest field goal percentage
 66.9% – Marco Killingsworth (Donetsk, 2013–14)
 Most free throws made
 219 – Stevan Jelovac (Nizhny Novgorod, 2017–18)
 Most free throws attempted
 243 – Stevan Jelovac (Nizhny Novgorod, 2017–18)
 Highest free throw percentage
 97.4% – Branko Mirković (Tsmoki-Minsk, 2015–16)
 Most 3-point field goals made
 103 – Alexey Shved (Khimki, 2016–17)
 Most 3-point field goals attempted
 268 – Alexey Shved (Khimki, 2016–17)
 Highest 3-point field goal percentage
 56.2% – Petr Gubanov (Nizhny Novgorod, 2016–17)
 Highest rebounds per game average
 11.3 – Frank Elegar (Kalev, 2014–15)
 Most rebounds
 275 – Latavious Williams (UNICS, 2015–16)
 Most defensive rebounds
 218 – Trey Thompkins (Nizhny Novgorod, 2014–15)
 Most offensive rebounds
 106 – Josh Boone (Khimki, 2015–16)
 Highest assists per game average
 9.20 – D. J. Cooper (Enisey, 2014–15)
 Most assists
 276 – D. J. Cooper (Enisey, 2014–15)
 Highest steals per game average
 3.00 – Tywain McKee (Triumph, 2012–13)
 Most steals
 64 – Howard Sant-Roos (ČEZ Nymburk, 2015–16)
 Highest blocks per game average
 2.38 – Bamba Fall (Kalev, 2012–13)
 Most blocks
 67 – Artsiom Parakhouski (Nizhny Novgorod, 2014–15)
 Highest turnovers per game average
 4.42 – Jerry Johnson (Astana, 2015–16)
 Most turnovers
 128 – Scott Machado (Kalev, 2014–15)
 Most personal fouls
 125 – Kaspars Bērziņš (Nizhny Novgorod, Zenit, 2015–16)
 Most double-doubles
 10 – five players

Career 
 Most games
 252 – Vitaly Fridzon
 Most minutes
 5490:41 – Sergei Monia
 Most points
 2677 – Alexey Shved
 Most consecutive 30+ point games
 2 – Cory Higgins (November 28, 2013 – December 7, 2013)
 Most consecutive 20+ point games
 6 – Randy Culpepper (December 8, 2013 – November 30, 2014)
 6 – Elmedin Kikanovic (April 5, 2015 – April 26, 2015)
 Most consecutive 10+ point games
 28 – Randy Culpepper (October 14, 2013 – March 17, 2015)
 Most field goals made
 856 – Alexey Shved
 Most field goals attempted
 1950 – Alexey Shved
 Most free throws made
 600 – Alexey Shved
 Most free throws attempted
 742 – Alexey Shved
 Most 3-point field goals made
 365 – Alexey Shved
 Most 3-point field goals attempted
 1031 – Alexey Shved
 Most rebounds
 998 – Andrey Vorontsevich
 Most defensive rebounds
 724 – Sergei Monia
 Most offensive rebounds
 316 – Evgeny Valiev
 Most assists
 776 – Miloš Teodosić
 Most steals
 251 – Vitaly Fridzon
 Most blocks
 209 – Sergei Monia
 Most received blocks
 67 – Nando de Colo, Tyrese Rice
 Most personal fouls
 602 – Semen Antonov
 Most received personal fouls
 638 – Nando de Colo
 Double-doubles
 25 – Frank Elegar

Team records

Game 
 Most points in a game
 135 – Avtodor (against Bisons) – April 10, 2016
 Most points in a half
 71 – Avtodor (against  Astana) – December 6, 2015
 Most points in a quarter
 41 – Lokomotiv-Kuban (against VITA) – February 21, 2016
 Most points in an overtime period
 22 – Astana (against Avtodor) – December 23, 2018
 Most combined points in a game
 227 – Avtodor (109) – Khimki (118) – February 15, 2017
 Most combined points in a half
 116 – Avtodor (55) – Khimki (61) – February 15, 2017
 Most combined points in a quarter
 65 – Lietuvos Rytas (38) – Tsmoki-Minsk (27) – March 16, 2012
 Most combined points in an overtime period
 36 – Neptunas (20) – Tsmoki-Minsk (16) – October 31, 2012 
 Fewest points in a game
 37 – Azovmash (against CSKA) – March 10, 2012
 Fewest points in a half
 12 – Azovmash (against CSKA) – January 19, 2014 
 Fewest points in a quarter
 2 – Azovmash (against CSKA) – January 19, 2014
 Fewest points in an overtime period
 2 – Triumph (against Žalgiris) – October 14, 2012
 Fewest combined points in a game
 95 – Spartak (45) – Prokom (50) – March 10, 2012
 Fewest combined points in a half
 37 – UNICS (18) – Spartak (19) – October 15, 2012
 Fewest combined points in a quarter
 10 – CSKA (4) – Azovmash (6) – March 10, 2012
 Fewest combined points in an overtime period
 8 – Žalgiris (6) – Triumph (2) – October 14, 2012
 Most field goals made in a game
 55 – Avtodor (against Bisons) – April 10, 2016
 Most field goals attempted in a game
 86 – Krasny Oktyabr (against Nymburk) – November 14, 2015
 86 – VITA (against Bisons) – January 11, 2016
 Most field goals missed in a game
 60 – Honka (against CSKA) – November 27, 2010
 Most 3-point field goals made in a game
 24 – Lokomotiv-Kuban (against VITA) – February 21, 2016
 Most 3-point field goals attempted in a game
 50 – Bisons (against  Avtodor) – April 10, 2016
 Most free throws made
 39 – Enisey (against Nizhny Novgorod) – October 21, 2017
 39 – CSKA (against Nizhny Novgorod) – October 13, 2018
 Most free throws attempted
 50 – Budivelnyk (against VEF) – March 4, 2012
 Largest margin of victory in a game
 63 – Lokomotiv-Kuban (114) – Kalev (51) – October 9, 2014
 Largest margin of victory in an overtime period
 17 – Astana (22) – Avtodor (5) – December 23, 2018
 Most rebounds in a game
 61 – Tsmoki-Minsk (against Honka) – January 28, 2011
 Most defensive rebounds in a game
 47 – Avtodor (against Bisons) – April 10, 2016
 Most offensive rebounds in a game
 32 – Kalev (against Avtodor) – December 28, 2014
 Most assists in a game
 46 – Khimki (against Astana) – February 14, 2016
 Fewest assists in a game
 2 – Nymburk (against Triumph) – October 21, 2012 
 Most steals in a game
 22 – Triumph (against Nymburk) – October 21, 2012
 Fewest steals in a game
 1 – 35 occasions
 Most blocks in a game
 16 – CSKA (against VITA) – January 24, 2016
 Fewest blocks in a game
 0 – 
 Most fouls in a game
 38 – Tsmoki-Minsk (against Lokomotiv-Kuban) – March 17, 2018
 Fewest fouls in a game
 7 – Žalgiris (against Lokomotiv-Kuban) – May 25, 2013
 7 – Bisons (against Krasnye Krylia) – March 29, 2015
 Most turnovers in a game
 27 – Tsmoki-Minsk (against CSKA) – January 21, 2012
 27 – Nymburk (against Triumph) – October 21, 2012
 27 – Tsmoki-Minsk (against Neptunas) – February 10, 2013
 27 – Astana (against CSKA) – November 23, 2014 
 27 – Avtodor (against Astana) – March 26, 2016
 Fewest turnovers in a game
 1 – Zenit (against Tsmoki-Minsk) – April 15, 2015 
 Largest comeback
?

Regular season 
 Best record
 18-0 – Khimki, 2013–14
 Worst record
 1-29 – VITA, 2015–16
 Most wins
 28 – CSKA, 2015–16
 Most losses
 29 – VITA, 2015–16
 Longest winning streak
 25 – Khimki (February 18, 2013 – October 19, 2014)
 Most points per game
 95.5 – Khimki, 2015–16
 Fewest points per game
 61.7 – Kalev, 2009–10
 Highest average point differential
+20.9 – CSKA, 2015–16
 Lowest average point differential
-28.4 – VITA, 2015–16

Playoffs
 Best record
 9-0 – CSKA, 2014–15, 2016–17, 2018–19

Franchise 
 Most wins in regular season
 179 – CSKA
 Most losses in regular season
 151 – Tsmoki-Minsk

Other records 
 Largest attendance at a game
 15,812 – Zalgiris – CSKA – October 28, 2012
 Triple-doubles
 Victor Khryapa, January 20, 2013, CSKA – VEF; 10 points, 13 rebounds, 10 assists
 Jeremy Chappell, November 2, 2013, Triumph – Neptunas; 18 points, 10 rebounds, 11 assists
 Bernard King, March 21, 2014, Krasny Oktyabr – Tsmoki-Minsk; 16 points, 11 rebounds, 11 assists
 Aaron Miles, May 4, 2014, Krasnye Krylia – Enisey; 13 points, 12 rebounds, 15 assists
 Scott Machado, February 1, 2015, Kalev – Nizhny Novgorod; 12 points, 10 rebounds, 14 assists
 Codi Miller-McIntyre, April 1, 2018, Parma – Enisey; 17 points, 11 rebounds, 11 assists
 Codi Miller-McIntyre, April 29, 2018, Parma – Avtodor; 16 points, 10 rebounds, 16 assists
 Youngest player to play a game
 16 years, 76 days – Goga Bitadze (VITA, October 4, 2015)
 Oldest player to play a game
 37 years, 299 days – Zakhar Pashutin (UNICS, February 26, 2012)
 Most overtimes
 2 – Krasnye Krylia – Budivelnyk, February 15, 2012 
 2 – Neptunas – Enisey, December 13, 2012
 2 – Spartak – Nizhny Novgorod, May 5, 2013
 2 – Tsmoki-Minsk – Azovmash, February 16, 2014
 2 – Khimki – Lokomotiv-Kuban, December 7, 2015
 2 – Enisey – Nymburk, February 8, 2016
 2 – Astana – Enisey, November 20, 2016
 2 – Avtodor – Astana, January 20, 2018
 2 – Nizhny Novgorod – Parma, December 23, 2018
 2 – Zenit – VEF, February 14, 2019

References

External links
 Players stats
 Team stats

Records
Basketball statistics